The Vulture Wally is a 1956 West German drama film directed by Franz Cap and starring Barbara Rütting, Carl Möhner and . Based on a popular novel which has had several film adaptations, it is part of the tradition of Heimatfilm.

The film's sets were designed by the art director Carl Ludwig Kirmse.

Cast
 Barbara Rütting as Geierwally
 Carl Möhner as Bärenjosef
  as Lorenz
 Til Kiwe as Vinzenz
 Maria Hofen as Luckard
 Franz Pfaudler as Höchstbauer
 Helga Neuner as Afra
 Walter Janssen as Curat
 Beppo Schwaiger as Benedikt
 Siegfried Rauch as Leander
 Gusti Kreissl as Retta
 Elinor von Wallerstein as Lammwirtin
 Ernst Reinhold as Bartl
 Anton Färber as Draxl
 Alfons Sailer as Anton
 Veronika Fitz as Rosa
 Fred Hennings as Pfarrer
 Franz Loskarn as Gendarm
 Alwin Emmert as Halbweger
 Viktor Afritsch as Jagdherr

See also
 The Vulture Wally (1921)
 La Leggenda di Wally (1930)
 La Wally (1932, based on the opera)
 The Vulture Wally (1940)

References

Bibliography 
 Goble, Alan. The Complete Index to Literary Sources in Film. Walter de Gruyter, 1999.

External links 
 

1956 films
West German films
German drama films
1956 drama films
1950s German-language films
Films directed by František Čáp
Films set in the Alps
Mountaineering films
Remakes of German films
1950s German films